The 2011 African Badminton Championships is a continental badminton championships  organized by the Badminton Confederation of Africa. This championships were held in Marrakesh, Morocco between 4-12 May.

Medalists

Medal table

References

External links 
 Individual Result
 Team Result

African Badminton Championships
2011 in African sport
Badminton tournaments in Morocco
African Badminton Championships